Juan Francisco Urquidi Márquez (16 July 1881 – 14 December 1938) was a Mexican politician and diplomat who served as envoy extraordinary and minister plenipotentiary of Mexico to Colombia from 8 October 1923 to 21 November 1927, and as envoy extraordinary and minister plenipotentiary of Mexico to El Salvador from 5 June 1928 to 16 March 1930. From 15 May to 29 October 1914, he also served as confidential agent of President Venustiano Carranza in the United States.

Biography

Urquidi was born on 16 July 1881 in Mexico City into a wealthy family with ancestry in Chihuahua. His father was Francisco de Paula Urquidi Cárdeña (1821-1881) and his mother Catalina Márquez Barraza (1835-1896). He completed high school at Dean Academy in Franklin, Massachusetts, and eventually graduated from the Massachusetts Institute of Technology with a bachelor's degree in civil engineering.

He died on 14 December 1938 in Mexico City.

Notes and references

1881 births
1938 deaths
Ambassadors of Mexico to Colombia
Ambassadors of Mexico to El Salvador
MIT School of Engineering alumni
Politicians from Mexico City